Zarzis Synagogue also known as Beit HaKnesset Mishkan Ya’akov, is located in the coastal town of Zarzis, Tunisia. It was built in around 1900 when the Jewish community of Zarzis numbered approximately 1,000. An arson attack in 1982, following Sabra and Shatila massacre in Lebanon, left the synagogue and Torah scrolls totally destroyed. It was subsequently rebuilt and is currently used by the town's remaining 100 Jews. 

The lavishly decorated synagogue leads into an open-air courtyard which has adjoining rooms which serve as the talmud torah. The head of the community is  Eliyahu Sofer.

See also
 List of synagogues in Tunisia

Orthodox Judaism in North Africa
Orthodox synagogues in Tunisia
Sephardi Jewish culture in North Africa
Sephardi synagogues
Zarzis
Religious buildings and structures destroyed by arson
Antisemitism in Tunisia